Lady Anne Mary Carr (née Somerset, born 21 January 1955) is an English historian and writer. She is a recipient of the Elizabeth Longford Prize, for Queen Anne: The Politics of Passion.

Biography
Lady Anne Somerset was born in England, and was educated in London, Gloucestershire, and Kent. She read history at King's College London, graduated in 1976 and began her professional career as a research assistant to several historians.

She published her own first book in 1980; it was a popular biography of King William IV, which was reprinted in 1993. She has gone on to write four further works, all focused on English history, mainly in the Tudor and Stuart periods. She has also written about the Affair of the Poisons in Louis XIV's France, and a well-received biography of Queen Anne.

Lady Anne is the widow of the artist Matthew Carr and daughter of David Somerset, 11th Duke of Beaufort. Her mother Caroline was the daughter of Henry Thynne, 6th Marquess of Bath, and the author Daphne Fielding.

Major works
 The Life and Times of King William IV, London, Weidenfeld & Nicolson 1980
 Ladies in Waiting: From the Tudors to the Present Day, London, Weidenfeld & Nicolson 1984
 Elizabeth I, London, Weidenfeld & Nicolson 1991
 Unnatural Murder: Poison at the Court of James I, London, Weidenfeld & Nicolson 1997
 The Affair of the Poisons: Murder, Infanticide & Satanism at the Court of Louis XIV, London, Weidenfeld & Nicolson 2003
 Queen Anne: The Politics of Passion, London: HarperPress 2012

References

1955 births
Living people
English historians
Alumni of King's College London
Daughters of English dukes